Bryce Joseph Hosannah (born 8 April 1999) is an English professional footballer who plays as a defender for National League club Wrexham.

Early and personal life
Born in Lambeth, Hosannah grew up in Brixton; his father was a former professional basketball player and his mother worked as a retail executive. He achieved five A* and four A grades at GCSE level. He began his football career at the age of 8 with the Afewee Urban academy.

Career

Leeds United
Having played for Crystal Palace's academy before being released in 2017, Hosannah signed for Leeds United in the summer of 2017, initially joining up with the club's under-23 squad. He signed a new two-year deal for Leeds in May 2018. In August 2019, Hosannah underwent surgery before finding his way into onto the Leeds bench for the first time as an unused substitute in a 2–0 victory against Huddersfield Town on 7 December 2019.

On 29 September 2020 Hosannah joined Bradford City on loan until the end of the 2020–21 season. In November 2020 he was one of a number of young Bradford City players playing in the first team who were praised by manager Stuart McCall. He returned to Leeds in April 2021 for rehab, following surgery to an injury sustained in December 2020. He made 11 appearances in all competitions during his loan at the club.

Wrexham
On 31 August 2021, Hosannah joined National League side Wrexham on a free transfer, signing a two-year deal. He was set to debut for the club on 2 October 2021 as a right wing-back against Aldershot Town, but the match was abandoned early into the second half with Wrexham winning 2–0. As such he made his debut three days later in a 1–1 draw at home to Chesterfield. He was sent off in his fifth appearance for the club (and the first game to be attended by the club's new owners Ryan Reynolds and Rob McElhenney) after being adjudged to have elbowed an opposition player as the club lost 3–2 to Maidenhead United. However, Hosannah served no punishment for his red card as the Football Association reviewed the incident and decided that Paul Mullin was responsible for the elbow and subsequently issued Mullin with a three-match ban.

Career statistics

References

Living people
1999 births
English footballers
Footballers from Lambeth
Association football defenders
Crystal Palace F.C. players
Leeds United F.C. players
Bradford City A.F.C. players
Wrexham A.F.C. players
English Football League players
English people of Guyanese descent